Gunpowder Meetinghouse is a historic Methodist church located at Aberdeen Proving Ground, Harford County, Maryland.  It is a one-room brick structure that may date to 1773.

It was listed on the National Register of Historic Places in 1974.

References

External links
, including photo from 1970, at Maryland Historical Trust

Methodist churches in Maryland
Churches in Harford County, Maryland
Churches on the National Register of Historic Places in Maryland
National Register of Historic Places in Harford County, Maryland